Winston Academy is a private college preparatory school in Louisville, Mississippi. It was founded in 1969 as a segregation academy.

History
When the Federal government enforced school integration, many white parents sought ways to keep their children from attending integrated schools. Winston Academy was founded in 1969 to provide white children a segregated education.

In 1969, the Louisville-Winston Educational Foundation voted to establish the school after receiving a report on the "public school situation facing our country". Foundation president David Richardson told a crowd of 300 citizens gathered at the county courthouse that "The only choice open to parents who want their children to continue to receive a high caliber education is to support a private school system in Winston County."

In the fall of 1970, the school stopped holding classes in local churches and moved into its permanent campus.

Demographics
Although the school posts a non-discrimination policy on their website, as of 2012, the student population was over 99% white.

Athletics
Winston Academy competes under the nickname Patriots within the Mississippi Association of Independent Schools.

Notable alumni
Andy Kennedy, Ole Miss college basketball coach
Mark Hudspeth, Mississippi State Football Coach and Former ULL Head Coach
Matthew Mitchell, Kentucky Women's Basketball Coach
Kim Rosamond, basketball coach, Tennessee Tech University Golden Eagles

References

Private high schools in Mississippi
Private middle schools in Mississippi
Private elementary schools in Mississippi
Preparatory schools in Mississippi
Segregation academies in Mississippi
Educational institutions established in 1969
1969 establishments in Mississippi